Leonard Joseph Weisgard (December 13, 1916 – January 14, 2000) was an American writer and illustrator of more than 200 children's books. He is known best for his collaborations with writer Margaret Wise Brown.

Biography 
Weisgard was born in New Haven, Connecticut, and spent most of his childhood in England. He studied art at the Pratt Institute in New York City.

His first book, Suki the Siamese Pussy, was published in 1937, and his first collaboration with Brown was two years later, The Noisy Book. He won the 1948 Caldecott Medal for U.S. picture book illustration, recognizing The Little Island, written by Brown. They collaborated again on The Important Book, published by Harper & Brothers in 1949. Altogether, Weisgard illustrated at least 14 of Brown's books, including two that were published posthumously. (Brown wrote the text for six books that were published as by "Golden MacDonald". All were unpaged picture books illustrated by Weisgard and published by Doubleday.)

Writer Marjorie Kinnan Rawlings was a Newbery Medal runner-up in 1956 for The Secret River, which Weisgard illustrated.

Weisgard married Phyllis Monnot in 1951 and moved to Copenhagen, Denmark, with her and their three children in 1969. He died on January 14, 2000, in Denmark.

References

External links
 
  with biography – copyright The Estate of Leonard Weisgard 
 Leonard Weisgard: Renowned Illustrator and Author at University of Connecticut Libraries
 

1916 births
2000 deaths
American children's writers
American expatriates in Denmark
Caldecott Medal winners
American children's book illustrators
Pratt Institute alumni
Writers from New Haven, Connecticut
Artists from New Haven, Connecticut